Stribling is a surname. Notable people with the surname include:

Bill Stribling (1927–2006), American football end in the National Football League
Channing Stribling (born 1994), American football player
Cornelius Stribling (1796–1880), rear admiral in the United States Navy
Melissa Stribling (1927–1992), Scottish film and television actress
Michael Stribling (born 1951), American musician, best known for his series of New Age albums
Robert Mackey Stribling (1833–1914), doctor, soldier and representative to the Virginia House of Delegates
Thomas Sigismund Stribling (1881–1965), American writer and lawyer, published under the name T.S. Stribling
Young Stribling (1904–1933), professional boxer in the Heavyweight division
Joan Yvonne Stribling English Artist, Film, TV Stage Designer-Hair, Make-up[&FX] & Singer

See also
J. C. Stribling Barn, brick barn built c. 1890 to 1900 at 220 Isaqueena Trail in Clemson, South Carolina
USS Stribling (DD-867), Gearing-class destroyer in the United States Navy
USS Stribling (DD-96), Wickes-class destroyer in the United States Navy during World War I
Stribog
Striplin Gym
Stripling (disambiguation)
Strobin